Uzyn is a city in Bila Tserkva Raion of Kyiv Oblast (province) of northern Ukraine. It hosts the administration of Uzyn urban hromada, one of the hromadas of Ukraine. Population: .

The largest industrial organisations within Uzyn are sugar plant (7% of Ukraine's sugar production), as well as a tinning factory. There is also Uzyn (air base) of the Ukrainian Air Forces.

History
Uzyn was first mentioned in the year 1590 under the name Uzenytsia, and later as Tenberschyna. Since the end of the 18th century, the city carries its current name. From 1923 to 1930, the city served as the raion centre of the Bilotserkivskyi Okrug. In 1956, Uzyn received the status of an urban-type settlement, and in 1971, the status of a city.

Demographics
The population of Uzyn is currently 11,935 (as of 2021): 
 1975 - 16,000 inhabitants
 2004 - 12,759 inhabitants
 2005 - 12,628 inhabitants
 2006 - 12,588 inhabitants

 2011 - 12,166 inhabitants
 2021 - 11,935 inhabitants

Notable people
 Pavel Popovich (1930–2009), a Soviet cosmonaut of Ukrainian descent, arguably the first ethnic Ukrainian to fly in space.

References

Links 
 UZYN Project - the relevance site.

Cities in Kyiv Oblast
Cities of district significance in Ukraine
Former closed cities